Amir Khan vs Lamont Peterson, billed as Capital Showdown, was a boxing match for Khan's WBA (Super) & IBF light welterweight titles. The fight took place in the Convention Center in Washington, D.C., United States, on 10 December 2011. Khan was making the first defense of his IBF belt against his mandatory challenger.

Build-up
Golden Boy Promotions CEO Richard Schaefer announced in a conference in London to officially kick off "Capital Showdown: Khan vs. Peterson".

The tour touts an HBO-televised bout featuring WBA (Super) & IBF light welterweight champion Amir Khan of Bolton, England, in the first defense of his IBF belt against mandatory challenger Lamont Peterson of Washington, D.C., which was slated for December 10 in Peterson's home town.

Khan had won eight consecutive fights, four of them by knockout. Peterson won an IBF eliminator with a 12th-round stoppage of Victor Cayo (26-2, 18 KOs) in July, earning the organization's No. 1 contender status and the right to challenge Khan.

Fight

The fight was fought in front of a packed house at the Convention Center, with an announced audience of 8,647. After an extremely close, evenly matched fight for 12 rounds, the heavily pro-Peterson crowd was thrilled by the split decision announced in Peterson's favor. Khan scored a knockdown in the first round, but was penalized twice by Referee Joe Cooper, once for excessive shoving with the forearm and later for hitting on the break. The points proved to be the difference on the two scorecards that favored Peterson.

Controversy 
After the bout Khan complained about the referee and made accusations of impropriety that the judges' scorecards had been "interfered with" by a man at ringside who celebrated with Peterson after the decision. This man was later identified as Mustafa Ameen, a figure affiliated to the IBF but who had no apparent reason to be involved. Khan's camp launched an appeal with the IBF in December principally on the grounds of "miscalculation of the scoring" and "inappropriate conduct by officials" and in January 2012, after reviewing the evidence, the WBA ordered a rematch.

Despite rumors, on 3 March 2012, the WBA did not reinstate Khan as the WBA Super Light-welterweight Champion.

However, on 8 May 2012, it emerged that Peterson failed a drugs test, testing positive for a banned substance thought to be synthetic testosterone, and the rematch has since been called off.

Main card

Televised
Super Lightweight Championship bout:  Amir Khan  vs.  Lamont Peterson
Peterson defeats Khan via split decision. (113-112, 113-112, 110-115)
Heavyweight bout:  Seth Mitchell vs.  Timur Ibragimov
Mitchell defeats Ibragimov by TKO at 2:48 of round 2.

Untelevised
Light Welterweight bout:  Anthony Peterson vs.  Daniel Attah
Peterson defeats Attah via unanimous decision.
Super Middleweight bout:  Fernando Guerrero vs.  Robert Kliewer
Guerrero defeats Kliewer by TKO at 0:45 of round 5.
Lightweight bout:  Jamie Kavanagh vs.  Ramesis Gil
Fight ends in a majority decision.
Welterweight bout:   Dusty Harrison vs.  Terrell Davis
Harrison defeats Davis by KO of round 1.
Light Heavyweight bout:  Thomas Williams Jr. vs.  Reynaldo Rodriguez

Lightweight bout:  Terron Grant vs.  Dashawn Autry
Grant defeats Autry by KO of round 1.
Lightweight bout:  Joshua Davis vs.  Christopher Russell
Davis defeats Russell via unanimous decision.

International broadcasting

References

External links

Boxing matches
2011 in boxing
Boxing in Washington, D.C.
2011 in sports in Washington, D.C.
Boxing on HBO
Golden Boy Promotions
Amir Khan (boxer)
December 2011 sports events in the United States